Abdul Razzaq as-Sawsa (3 February 1933 – 10 March 2016) was the General Secretary of the General People's Congress, and as such the head of state of Libya from 7 October 1990 to 18 November 1992.

References

1933 births
2016 deaths
Heads of state of Libya
Secretaries-General of the General People's Congress